Rebiba is an Italian surname. Notable people with this surname include:

 Giovanni Domenico Rebiba (died 1604), Italian Roman Catholic bishop of Ortona (1570–1595) and then of Catania
 Prospero Rebiba (died 1593), Italian Roman Catholic Titular Patriarch of Constantinople (1573–1593)
 Scipione Rebiba (1504–1577), Italian cardinal of the Catholic Church

Italian-language surnames